Brigadier General Thomas Grafton Hanson (May 1, 1865 – May 23, 1945) was a United States Army officer in the late 19th and early 20th centuries. He served in several conflicts, including World War I, during which he commanded the 89th Infantry Division.

Military career
Hanson was born on May 1, 1865, in San Rafael, California. He graduated thirty-fourth in a class of sixty-four from the United States Military Academy (USMA) at West Point, New York, in June 1887. A large number of his classmates would go on to become general officers in the future, such as Charles S. Farnsworth, Ulysses G. McAlexander, Edmund Wittenmyer, Mark L. Hersey, Charles Gerhardt, William Weigel, Ernest Hinds, Nathaniel Fish McClure, Marcus Daniel Cronin, Herman Hall, George Owen Squier, James Theodore Dean, Frank Herman Albright, George Washington Gatchell, Alexander Lucian Dade and Michael Joseph Lenihan.

Hanson was commissioned into the 19th Infantry Regiment, and he did frontier duty from 1887 to 1890. He graduated from the Infantry and Cavalry School in 1891. During the Spanish–American War, Hanson served in Cuba and Puerto Rico, and he went to the Philippines shortly thereafter. Hanson taught at the USMA from 1901 to 1905 as an assistant professor of modern languages. He then graduated from the Army School of the Line and the Army Staff College between 1910 and 1912.

Hanson was promoted to the rank of brigadier general on August 5, 1917, after the American entry into World War I. He assumed command of the 178th Infantry Brigade, part of the 89th Infantry Division, first at Camp Funston and later in France, where he led it in numerous battles, including the Battle of Saint-Mihiel and the Meuse-Argonne Offensive. Hanson briefly commanded the entire 89th Division from December 24 to 27, 1917.

Hanson retired on January 4, 1919, at his permanent rank of colonel. He lived in San Francisco and died in Oakland, California, on May 23, 1945, shortly after the end of World War II in Europe.

Personal life
Hanson married Pauline DeForest on September 1, 1893. Together, they had two children.

References

Bibliography

External links

1865 births
1945 deaths
United States Army Infantry Branch personnel
People from San Rafael, California
People from San Francisco
American military personnel of the Spanish–American War
United States Army generals of World War I
United States Military Academy alumni
United States Army Command and General Staff College alumni
United States Army generals
United States Military Academy faculty
Military personnel from California